"Nixon vs. Kennedy" is the twelfth episode of the first season of American television series Mad Men. The episode was originally broadcast on AMC on October 11, 2007, in the United States. In the show, Sterling Cooper employees party after hours, promotions occur, and the audience gains more insight into Don Draper's past.

Plot 
The episode opens with a television presentation of voters waiting in line to cast their ballot for the 1960 United States presidential election. After Sterling Cooper’s partners leave the office for the night, the staff commence a viewing party for the election, with Nixon clearly in the lead over Kennedy. The party, however, is dominated by widespread drinking and tomfoolery. The party takes a more comical turn when the staff discover a screenplay written by Paul. Several staff act out the play, concluding with Sal and Joan sharing a kiss, and Harry has a drunken affair with Pete’s secretary. The following morning, the office is in disarray.

Before the party, Pete lobbies Don to hire him over the more ideal Duck Phillips, but Don remains unwilling to consider Pete for promotion. At home that night, Pete digs through Don’s box of childhood memories, but draws ire from his wife for having secrets. The following day, Pete approaches Don with the box and when he again refuses to consider Pete for the head of accounts position, Pete threatens to use this information against Don. After a difficult conversation with Peggy about fairness and accountability, Don hires Duck as the new head of accounts and pressures Pete to reveal Don’s secrets to Bert Cooper. Bert acts uninterested, noting Don’s dedication and value to the company. After kicking Pete out, Bert gives Don permission to fire Pete from the company.

Don has a flashback to the Korean War when he views the box's contents. In 1950, Dick Whitman, Don’s past self, meets Lieutenant Donald Draper, an engineer and Dick’s sole companion at a new encampment. The flashback is cut short, and the distress caused leads Don to run to Rachel. Don attempts to convince her to run away with him, but she realizes he is cowardly and promptly ends their affair. 

After Don and Pete’s confrontation with Bert, Don has another flashback. Dick and Donald are attacked, but survive by hiding in their trench. During the attack, a fuel tank is hit, which causes a  leak, resulting in an explosion that kills Donald. Dick, although wounded, switches dog tags, allowing him to assume Donald’s identity and be awarded a Purple Heart. Donald’s body is returned to Dick’s family. Adam spots Dick in the train, but is unable to convince his parents before the train departs. The episode ends with Don entering his living room to watch Nixon’s concession of the election.

Production 
“Nixon vs. Kennedy" was written by Lisa Albert, Andre Jacquemetton, and Maria Jacquemetton, and directed by Alan Taylor. The episode was shot in Los Angeles, California, and its production budget ranged between 2-2.5 million dollars.

Director Alan Taylor noted that the office party reflected the celebration of the show being greenlit and the pilot actors returning as full-time cast members. The production staff had the show's actors “hanging out” in the background when they lacked lines to make the party feel more authentic. Taylor also notes the comparisons between the workplace power struggle and the election between Nixon and Kennedy. When Don tells Pete off in Pete’s office, Kennedy is on the television in the background. This was done intentionally, as Don’s remarks about Pete reflect “what Nixon would say about Kennedy”. Additionally, Jon Hamm broke his hand during the rehearsal for the Korean War explosion scene. Because this was one of the first scenes filmed for the episode, his right hand is not in view for most of his subsequent scenes.

Featured Soundtracks include A Beautiful Mine by Aceyalone, Moonglow by Benny Goodman, and The End Of The World by Skeeter Davis.

Reception 
The AV Club regarded the episode as one of the “finest hours” of the first season, delivering particular praise for the scene wherein Pete reveals Don’s secret to Bert Cooper. Vulture lauded the episode for being “fully loaded”, highlighting the episode’s comparison of Don and Pete’s power struggle to the presidential election. Vulture additionally praised the episode for serving as a strong companion to the season finale, stating that both episodes “feel like halves of the same novella or movie”.

"Nixon vs. Kennedy" received a nomination for Outstanding Prosthetic Makeup for a Series, Miniseries, Movie or Special at the 2008 Primetime Creative Arts Emmy Awards.

References

External links 
 

Mad Men (season 1) episodes
2007 American television episodes